Elena Altsjoel (also Altshul, Altchul or Altchoul; , born 4 April 1964 in Minsk, Belarusian SSR) was the Women's World Draughts Champion in 1980 and from 1982 to 1985. She won her championship as a Soviet player, but today resides in Germany with her husband Vadim Virny.

References 

Soviet draughts players
Belarusian draughts players
German draughts players
Players of international draughts
Honoured Masters of Sport of the USSR
1964 births
Living people
Sportspeople from Minsk